Conus colombianus is a species of sea snail, a marine gastropod mollusk in the family Conidae, the cone snails, cone shells or cones.

These snails are predatory and venomous. They are capable of "stinging" humans.

Description
Original description: "Shell small for genus, stocky, broad across shoulder; spire low, flattened; shoulder sharp-angled; body whorl smooth, with 10 small spiral cords around the anterior end; spire with 4 spiral threads; shell pale yellow with 4 closely-spaced brown lines around body whorl just below (anterior of) mid-body;  brown flammules and white blotches run through 4 lines and extend over anterior tip; body whorl above (posterior of) mid-body line without markings or pattern; spire marked with large, evenly-spaced orange-tan flammules; spire flammules extend onto sharp edge of shoulder, giving shoulder checkered appearance; interior of aperture white."

The size of the shell varies between 22.5 mm and 57 mm.

Distribution
Locus typicus: "Off Islas del Rosario, Colombia."

References

 Petuch, E. J. 1987. New Caribbean Molluscan Faunas. 114, plate 17, figure 11-12.
 Petuch E. (2013) Biogeography and biodiversity of western Atlantic mollusks. CRC Press. 252 pp.
 Puillandre N., Duda T.F., Meyer C., Olivera B.M. & Bouchet P. (2015). One, four or 100 genera? A new classification of the cone snails. Journal of Molluscan Studies. 81: 1-23

External links
 World Register of Marine Species
 Gastropods.com: Magelliconus magellanicus colombianus (var.)

colombianus
Gastropods described in 1987